Saksida is a Slovenian surname that has been adapted to its Slavic form from the original German name Saks. The root is Sachsen, which means 'one from Saxony', and among other variant forms it includes Sachs, Sacks, and Saks.

Name etymology
According to the Slovene linguist Silvo Torkar in Slovenia there is a common group of suffixes that are added to the end of surnames that create a Slovene identity; some examples are -ski (Ledinski, Pisanski); -nik (Potočnik, Kotnik, Breznik, Blatnik), -c, -ec, -ic, -ac (Konc, Samec, Sajovic, Komac), -ica (Jurca, Hvalica), -da (Kenda), and -ida (Saksida).

People

 Alenka Saksida (born 1942), conductor and cultural activist
 Igor Saksida (born 1965), literary historian
 Iztok Saksida, sociologist
 Kolja Saksida, actor
 Lisa Saksida, Canadian neuroscientist
 Pavle Saksida, mathematician
 Rudolf Saksida (1913–1984), painter
 Teja Saksida, singer
 Sonja Saksida (born 1963), scientist, veterinarian
 Žiga Saksida, musician

See also
Sachs
Saks (disambiguation)
Sacks (surname)

Notes

Slavic-language surnames
Slovene-language surnames